Jolene Brand (born Jolene Marie Bufkin; July 31, 1934) is an American actress. She acted most in the 1950s and 1960s, and appeared in seven episodes of the Ernie Kovacs television shows.

Career
In 1958, she acted in the B-film Giant from the Unknown, about a man who was frozen in suspended animation for 500 years and was freed by a lightning bolt and goes on a killing spree. Later that year she was signed up to play a part in the Disney television show Zorro. She played the romantic interest for the main character played by Guy Williams. She was a model on the television series Queen for a Day as well.

Brand portrayed "Indian Emily" in the 1959 episode of the same name on the syndicated television anthology series, Death Valley Days, hosted by Stanley Andrews. The setting is the United States Army outpost at Fort Davis, Texas. Emily, an Apache captive, adopts the white man's ways but flees when a young officer, Tom Easton (Burt Metcalfe), whom she loves, prepares to marry someone else. She returns to warn the fort of a pending Apache attack, and dies of a gunshot wound fired in error after saving the fort. Meg Wyllie played Tom's compassionate mother, Mrs. Easton. A memorial at Fort Davis honors the heroism of Indian Emily. Brand and her husband George Schlatter were close friends with Kovacs and his wife, Edie Adams.

Filmography

Film

Television

External links

References

1934 births
Living people
20th-century American actresses
21st-century American women